Steven Elm (born August 12, 1975 in Red Deer, Alberta) is a Canadian speed skater from Calgary, Alberta.

Elm has been to three Olympics, and in the 2006 Winter Olympics he won a silver medal as part of the Canadian men's pursuit team. He formerly held the world record in the 3000 m from 2000 to 2001. He also broke the world record in the team pursuit, along with Arne Dankers and Denny Morrison in 2007.

Records

Personal records

World records 

Source: SpeedSkatingStats.com

References

External links
Steven Elm at SpeedSkatingStats.com

1975 births
Living people
Canadian male speed skaters
World record setters in speed skating
Medalists at the 2006 Winter Olympics
Olympic medalists in speed skating
Olympic silver medalists for Canada
Speed skaters from Calgary
Sportspeople from Red Deer, Alberta
Speed skaters at the 1998 Winter Olympics
Speed skaters at the 2002 Winter Olympics
Speed skaters at the 2006 Winter Olympics
21st-century Canadian people